Otto (/1060) was count of Savoy from around 1051 until his death. Through marriage to Adelaide, the heiress of Ulric Manfred II, he also administered the march of Susa from around 1046 until his death.

Family
He was a younger son of Humbert the White-Handed and his wife, Ancilla of Lenzburg. Through Humbert's service to the German emperors, the family was granted the counties of Maurienne, Aosta and Sapaudia (Savoy), all at the expense of local bishops or archbishops. Otto inherited the family's realms after the death of his brother Amadeus .

In 1046, he married Adelaide, heiress of the march of Susa and county of Turin. They had:

 Peter (d. 1078)
 Amadeus (d. 1080)
 Otto
 Bertha (d. 1087), wife of Henry IV of Germany
 Adelaide (d. 1080), married Rudolf of Swabia

Rule
Through his marriage to Adelaide, Otto obtained extensive possessions in northern Italy. Thereafter, the House of Savoy concentrated its expansion efforts towards Italy instead of north of the Alps as it had done before. Savoy's lands occupied much of modern Savoy and Piedmont, although several other small states could be found between them. In the 1050s, Otto allowed coins to be minted at Aiguebelle. The archbishop of Vienne, Léger, who had sole right of minting in the region, complained to Pope Leo IX, so Otto forbade further coining at Aiguebelle.

Notes

References

Sources

External links
Oddo, Graf von Savoyen (1051-1059) (in German)
Othon de Savoie (in French)
G. Sergi, 'Oddone di Moriana-Savoia,' in “Dizionario Biografico degli Italiani” – Volume 79 (2013)

Nobility from Turin
11th-century Counts of Savoy

1020s births
11th-century deaths
Year of birth uncertain
Year of death uncertain
Place of birth unknown
Place of death unknown